Fares is a masculine given name and a surname. People with the name include:

Given name

Fares
Fares Arnaout (born 1997), Syrian football player
Fares El-Bakh (born 1998), Qatari weightlifter
Fares Bayoush (born 1970), Syrian military officer 
Fares Dessouky (born 1994), Egyptian squash player
Fares Djabelkheir (born 1975), Algerian football player
Fares Fares (born 1973), Swedish-Lebanese actor of Assyrian descent
Fares Al-Garzae (born 2001), Saudi Arabian football player
Fares Hamdi (born 1980), Tunisian paralympian athlete
Fares Al-Helou (born 1961), Syrian actor
Fares Karam (born 1973), Lebanese singer
Fares Maakaroun (born 1940), Lebanese Brazilian Melkite Greek Catholic bishop 
Fares Mana'a (born 1965), Yemeni arms-dealer, businessman rebel commander and politician
Fares D. Noujaim, Lebanese American banker
Fares Juma Al Saadi (born 1988), Emirati football player
Fares Souaid (born 1958), Lebanese politician
Fares Sayegh, Greek surgeon

Farès
Farès Bahlouli (born 1995), French football player
Farès Benabderahmane (born 1987), Algerian football player
Farès Boueiz (born 1955), Lebanese politician
Farès Bousdira (born 1953), Algerian-born French football player
Farès Brahimi (born 1988), Algerian football player
Farès Chaïbi (born 2002), French football player
Farès Fellahi (born 1975), Algerian football player
Farès Ferjani (born 1997), Tunisian fencer
Farès Hachi (born 1989), Algerian football player
Farès Hamiti (born 1987), Algerian football player
Farés Mehenni (born 2002), Algerian football player
Farès Ziam (born 1997), French mixed martial artist

Surname

Fares
Abbas Fares (1902–1978), Egyptian actor
Amber Fares, Lebanese Canadian filmmaker
Angelina Fares (born 1989), Israeli model
Ayman Abu Fares (born 1988), Jordanian football player
Fabiana Fares (born 1972), Italian pentathlete
Fuad Fares (born 1955), Israeli biologist and pharmacologist
Imad Fares (born 1961), Israeli military officer
Issam Fares (born 1937), Lebanese businessman and politician
Jallouli Fares (1909–2001), Tunisian politician
Jawad Fares (born 1991), Lebanese physician and scientist
Josef Fares (born 1977), Swedish film director
Kathlyn Fares (born 1942), American politician 
Laura Fares (born 1978), Argentine musician
Mohamad Fares (footballer born 1990), Syrian football player
Myriam Fares (born 1983), Lebanese singer and entertainer
Nawaf al-Fares, Syrian diplomat
Nicole Fares, Lebanese academic and translator
Ola Al-Fares (born 1985), Jordanian lawyer and journalist 
Omar Abu Fares (born 1984), Jordanian swimmer
Qadura Fares, Palestinian politician
Raed Fares (born 1982), Palestinian football player
Raed Fares (activist) (1972–2018), Syrian political activist
Roy Fares (born 1984), Lebanese-born Swedish pastry chef
Sonia Fares (born 1949), Lebanese fashion designer 
Tara Fares (1996–2018), Iraqi model
Tania Fares, fashion writer
Youssef Fares (neurosurgeon), Lebanese neurosurgeon and academic 
Youssef Fares (sport shooter) (1906–date of death unknown), Egyptian sports shooter

Farès
Abderrahmane Farès (1911–1991), Algerian politician
Mohamed Farès (born 1996), Algerian football player
Nabile Farès (1940–2016), Algerian novelist 
Nadia Farès (born 1968), French actress

Phares
Walid Phares or Fares (born 1957), Lebanese-born American scholar and conservative political pundit

Arabic masculine given names
Arabic-language surnames